Pardon My Pups is a 1934 Shirley Temple short film about a young boy named Sonny Rogers who wants a motorcycle for his birthday but his stubborn father insists on getting an expensive hunting dog instead even though Sonny hates dogs and the father blatantly just wants the dog for himself.  Sonny runs away from home but ends up returning with a pregnant lost dog he found, but the father orders him to take her to the pound to be put down.  Sonny hides the dog instead.  The father later realizes that the dog was actually Queeny, the mother of the unborn pup he was planning to buy.  When Harry, Queeny's owner, finds Queeny where Sonny was hiding her, Harry attempts to beat her for running away but Sonny stops him and the two fight.  In the end Sonny wins the fight and forces Harry to let him keep Queeny.

Cast
Frank Coghlan Jr. as Sonny Rogers 
Shirley Temple as Mary Lou Rogers
Kenneth Howell as Harry Vanderpool
Dorothy Ward as Phyllis
Harry Myers as Mr. Rogers
Virginia True Boardman as Mrs. Rogers

External links

1934 films
1934 comedy films
American black-and-white films
Educational Pictures short films
American comedy short films
1930s English-language films
1930s American films